Fenerbahçe Men's Volleyball, commonly known as Fenerbahçe, are the men's volleyball department of Fenerbahçe SK, a major Turkish multi-sport club based in Istanbul, Turkey. Founded in 1927, they are one of the most successful volleyball teams in Turkey, having won five Turkish Volleyball League titles, four Turkish Cups, and four Turkish Super Cups, among others. In Europe Fenerbahçe have won two Balkan Cups and the CEV Challenge Cup in the 2013–14 season, thus writing volleyball history as the women's team won another continental title, the CEV Cup, the very same day. By achieving this unparalleled feat, Fenerbahçe became the first and only sports club in Turkey and one of a few in Europe with European titles won in both the men's and women's volleyball departments.

The club play their home matches at the 7,000-seated TVF Burhan Felek Sport Hall.

Previous names
Fenerbahçe (1927–2011)
Fenerbahçe Grundig (2011–2015)
Fenerbahçe (2015–present)

History
After a series of intermittent existences, 1927-1935, 1940-1942, 1943-1971, it was founded in its present form in 1976. The team began in the Istanbul Fourth League and was promoted to the Third League in 1977, to the Second League in 1982 and finally to the First League in 1984. As champions of the Istanbul First League in 1985, Fenerbahçe were promoted to the top-level Men's Volleyball League.

Honours
Source:

European competitions
 CEV Top Teams Cup / CEV Cup
 Semifinalists (1): 2016–17
 Quarterfinalists (2): 2004–05, 2011–12
 CEV Challenge Cup
 Winners (1): 2013–14
 Balkan Cup
 Winners (2) (shared-record): 2009, 2013

Domestic competitions
 Turkish Volleyball League
 Winners (5): 2007–08, 2009–10, 2010–11, 2011–12, 2018–19
 Runners-up (5): 2003–04, 2005–06, 2008–09, 2013–14, 2020–21
 Turkish Cup
 Winners (4): 2007–08, 2011–12, 2016–17, 2018–19
 Runners-up (2): 2010–11, 2013–14
 Turkish Super Cup
 Winners (4) (shared-record): 2011, 2012, 2017, 2020
 Runners-up (3): 2010, 2014, 2019
 Turkish Federation Cup (defunct)
 Winners (2): 1962, 1966
 Runners-up (2): 1961, 1970

Regional competitions
 Istanbul Volleyball League (defunct)
 Winners (10): 1926–27, 1927–28, 1928–29, 1929–30, 1932–33, 1933–34, 1940–41, 1966–67, 1967–68, 1968–69
 Runners-up (6): 1934–35, 1945–46, 1962–63, 1963–64, 1964–65, 1965–66
 Third place (4): 1931–32, 1944–1945, 1946–47, 1961–62

The road to the CEV Challenge Cup victory

Current squad

Squad as of 2022/23

Technical and managerial staff
Staff as of April 28, 2019

Team captains
This is a list of the senior team's captains in the recent years.

Head coaches

This is a list of the senior team's head coaches in the recent years.

Home halls
This is a list of the home halls the senior team played at in the recent years.

Notable players

Domestic Players

Kadir Arslan
Can Ayvazoğlu
Emre Batur
Erden Çevikel
Ersin Durgut
Arslan Ekşi
Hakan Fertelli
Uğur Güneş
Burak Hascan
Cengizhan Kartaltepe
Kemal Kayhan
Serkan Kılıç
İsmail Cem Kurtar
Soner Mezgitçi
Ali Peçen
Yasin Sancak
Nuri Şahin
Ahmet Toçoğlu
Burak Yavuz
İbrahim Başaran
Burak Hazırol
Metin Toy
Turgay Doğan
Emin Gök
Ediz Kaan Fırıncıoğlu

European Players

Frank Depestele
Wout Wijsmans

Tomislav Čošković 

Marcus Böhme

Nikos Samaras †

Matej Černič 

Novica Bjelica
Andrija Gerić
Vladimir Grbić
Ivan Miljković
Miloš Nikić

 Slovakia
Lukáš Diviš

Dariusz Stanicki

Non-European Players

Jerónimo Bidegain
Lucas Chávez
Santiago Darraidou
Juan Pablo Porello
Rodrigo Quiroga
Camilo Sato

Luiz Felipe Fonteles
Thiago Soares Alves

Salvador Hidalgo Oliva
Leonel Marshall
Ihosvany Hernández

Brook Billings
Gabriel Gardner
William McKenzie
James Polster

Ernardo Gómez

Players whose names are italicized still play for the team

Sponsorship and kit manufacturers

1 Main sponsorship
2 Back sponsorship
3 Lateral sponsorship
4 Short sponsorship
5 Sleeves sponsorship

See also
 Fenerbahçe SK
 Fenerbahçe Women's Volleyball

References

External links
 Official website of Fenerbahçe SK 
Media
 Official Twitter Account of Fenerbahçe Volleyball

Fenerbahçe Volleyball
Volleyball clubs established in 1927
1927 establishments in Turkey